Rabbi is a cultivar of the palm date that is widely grown in Iran (especially in Balochistan and Kerman) as well as in Pakistan. It has an elongated shape, and its skin has a reddish hue. As a semi-dry date, it can be stored for long periods of time due to its low moisture content.

See also
List of date cultivars

References

Date cultivars
Agriculture in Iran